Ulasovskaya is a rural locality (a village) in Rakulo-Kokshengskoye Rural Settlement of Velsky District, Arkhangelsk Oblast, Russia. The population was 4 as of 2014.

Geography 
Ulasovskaya is located on the Kokshenga River, 55 km east of Velsk (the district's administrative centre) by road. Begunovskaya is the nearest rural locality.

References 

Rural localities in Velsky District